Thong is a type of narrow garment that primarily covers the pubic area. 

Thong may also refer to:
 Thong, Kent, a village in England
 Thong (shoe) or flip-flops, a type of sandal
 Thong (surname), a Chinese and Cambodian surname
 Thōng (surname) or Chang, a Chinese surname
 Thongchai Sukkoki or Thong (born 1973), footballer from Thailand
 Thongchai Rathchai or Thong (born 1982), footballer from Thailand

See also
 Thongchai, a Thai name